Kikori District is a district of  the Gulf Province of Papua New Guinea.  Its capital is Kikori.

References

Districts of Papua New Guinea
Gulf Province